The Unreal Never Lived is the fourth full-length album by American band YOB. It was released in August 2005 under Metal Blade.

Track listing

Personnel
Music
 Mike Scheidt - vocals, guitars
 Isamu Sato - bass, vocals (track 4)
 Travis Foster - drums

Production
 Billy Barnett - mastering, mixing
 Mike Schiedt - mixing, mastering

References

Yob (band) albums
2005 albums